

League pyramid

All women's leagues in Scotland are part of a pyramid structure, with the Scottish Women's Premier League being at the top. Leagues become more regional at the bottom.

Clubs are allowed numerous teams in the Leagues, however, no club can be permitted to have more than one team in each of the top two divisions. More than one team from the same club can, however, compete in the 2nd divisions.

The Women's football in Scotland pyramid has 4 steps in it. They are:

Scottish Women's Premier League

The teams below are competing in the Scottish Women's Premier League in the 2021 season:

SWPL1
 Aberdeen
 Celtic
 Glasgow City
 Hamilton Academical
 Hearts
 Hibernian
 Motherwell
 Partick Thistle
 Rangers
 Spartans

SWPL2
 Boroughmuir Thistle
 Dundee United
 Glasgow Women
 Kilmarnock
 Queen's Park
 St Johnstone
 Stirling University

Scottish Women's First Division

The teams below are competing in the Scottish Women's First Division in the 2021 season:

SWFL 1 North
Buchan
Dryburgh Athletic
Dundee West
Dunfermline Athletic
East Fife
Grampian
Inverness Caledonian Thistle
Montrose
Stonehaven
Westdyke

SWFL 1 South
 Airdrie United
 Ayr United
 Broomhill
 Clyde
 Edinburgh Caledonia
 Edinburgh City
 Falkirk
 Gartcairn
 Gleniffer Thistle
 Greenock Morton
 Hutchison Vale
 Livingston
 Renfrew
 Rossvale
 St Mirren
 Stenhousemuir
 United Glasgow

Scottish Women's Second Division

The teams below are competing in the Scottish Women's Football League Second Division in the 2019 season:

North
 Buchan Youth
 Buckie Thistle
 Caithness
 Forfar Farmington Development
 Moray
 Ross County
 Turriff United

West
 Bishopton
 Dumbarton United — withdrew
 Gleniffer Thistle
 Kilwinning
 Pollok United
 Queen of the South — withdrew
 Rutherglen
 St Mirren
 Stranraer
 United Glasgow

Central
 Airdrie
 Broxburn Athletic
 Cumbernauld Colts Yellows
 East Kilbride
 Glasgow Girls Development
 Hamilton Academical Under-23s
 Hawick United
 Motherwell Development
 Murieston United
 St Mirren
 West Park United

East
 Bonnyrigg Rose
 Dryburgh Athletic
 Dundee City
 East Fife Violets
 Edinburgh Caledonia
 GOC
 Hearts Development
 Hutchison Vale Development
 Jeanfield Swifts Development
 Kelty Hearts
 Lothian
 Spartans Development

See also
Women's football (soccer)
List of women's national football teams
List of women's football teams
List of women's football (soccer) competitions. 
 London Fc Women 
 Clyde City

References

Scotland women
 
Women